Borgo Ticino (Piedmontese: Borgh Tisén, Lombard: Burgh Tisin) is a comune (municipality) in the Province of Novara in the Italian region of Piedmont, located about  northeast of Turin and about  north of Novara.

Borgo Ticino borders the following municipalities: Agrate Conturbia, Castelletto sopra Ticino, Comignago, Divignano, Varallo Pombia, and Veruno.

References

External links
 Official website

Cities and towns in Piedmont